CNN International Latin America is the Latin American feed of CNN International subscription news network. It is mainly based in Atlanta, Georgia (U.S.), but it also has regional offices in Mexico City, Santiago (Chile), Buenos Aires (Argentina) and São Paulo (Brazil).

Prior to 1997, it also used to air some programming made in Spanish, mainly newscasts such as Las Noticias. This stopped with the launch of CNN en Español.

CNN